Oxford University was a university constituency electing two members to the British House of Commons, from 1603 to 1950. The last two members to represent Oxford University when it was abolished were A. P. Herbert and Arthur Salter.

Boundaries, electorate and electoral system
This university constituency was created by a Royal Charter of 1603. It was abolished in 1950 by the Representation of the People Act 1948.

The constituency was not a physical area. Its electorate consisted of the graduates of the University of Oxford. Before 1918 the franchise was restricted to male graduates with a Doctorate or MA degree. Namier and Brooke estimated the number of electors as about 500 in the 1754–1790 period; by 1910, it had risen to 6,500.  Following the reforms of 1918, the franchise encompassed all graduates who paid a fee of £1 to join the register.  This included around 400 women who had passed examinations which would have entitled them to a degree if they were male.

The constituency returned two Members of Parliament. From 1918, the MPs were elected by the single transferable vote method of proportional representation.

History
The university strongly supported the old Tory cause in the 18th century. The original party system endured long after it had become meaningless in almost every other constituency.

After the Hanoverian succession to the British throne the Whigs became dominant in the politics of Cambridge University, the other university represented in Parliament, by using a royal prerogative power to confer doctorates. That power did not exist at Oxford, so the major part of the university electorate remained Tory (and in the first half of the 18th century sometimes Jacobite) in sympathy.

The university also valued its independence from government. In a rare contested general election in 1768 the two candidates with administration ties were defeated.

In the 19th century the university continued to support the right, almost always returning Tory, Conservative or Liberal Unionist candidates. The only exception was William Ewart Gladstone, formerly "the rising hope of the stern unbending Tories". He first represented the university as a Peelite, supporting a former member for the constituency – the sometime Conservative Prime Minister Sir Robert Peel. Gladstone retained his seat as a Liberal, for a time after 1859. Following Gladstone's defeat, in 1865, subsequent Liberal candidates were rare and they were never successful in winning a seat.

Even after the introduction of proportional representation, in 1918, both members continued to be Conservatives until 1935. Independent members were elected in the last phase of university elections to Parliament, before the constituency was abolished in 1950.

Members of Parliament
Sir William Whitelock is named by Rayment as "Sir William Whitelocke" and by Sedgwick as "Sir William Whitlock".
 
The Roman numerals in brackets after the names of the two members called William Bromley (who were father and son) are included to distinguish them. It is not a method which would have been used by the men themselves.

Constituency created (1603)

Parliament of England 1604–1707
As there were sometimes significant gaps between Parliaments held in this period, the dates of first assembly and dissolution are given. Where the name of the member has not yet been ascertained, the entry unknown is entered in the table.

Notes:-
 a Date of Pride's Purge, which converted the Long Parliament into the Rump Parliament.
 b Date when Oliver Cromwell dissolved the Rump Parliament by force.
 c Date when the members of the nominated or Barebones Parliament were selected. The university was not represented in this body.
 d Date when the members of the First Protectorate Parliament were elected. The university was represented by one member in this body.
 e Date when the members of the Second Protectorate Parliament were elected. The university was represented by one member in this body.
 f The Rump Parliament was recalled and subsequently Pride's Purge was reversed, allowing the full Long Parliament to meet until it agreed to dissolve itself.
 g Clarges died on 4 October 1695, so the seat was vacant at the dissolution of 11 October 1695.
 h The MPs of the last Parliament of England and 45 members co-opted from the former Parliament of Scotland, became the House of Commons of the 1st Parliament of Great Britain which assembled on 23 October 1707 (see below for the members in that Parliament).

Parliaments of Great Britain 1707–1800 and of the United Kingdom 1801–1950

Constituency abolished (1950)

Notes:-
 1 Bromley had represented the university since a by-election in March 1701. He was Speaker of the House of Commons 1710–1713.
 2 Abbot was Speaker of the House of Commons 1802–1817.
 3 Estcourt and Inglis are regarded as Conservative MPs from 1835, as this was the approximate date when the Tory Party became known as the Conservative Party.
 4 Gladstone accepted office in a Liberal ministry in 1859, thus vacating the seat he had held (as a Peelite MP – more formally a Liberal Conservative). He was re-elected as a Liberal candidate.
 5 Anson became a Conservative MP when the Liberal Unionists formally merged with the Conservatives in 1912.
 6 Cecil joined the non-Coalition wing of his party at some point during the 1918–1922 Parliament.

Elections

Elections in the 1710s

 Note (1715): Bromley had been Speaker of the House of Commons 1710-1713.
 Death of Whitelock

Elections in the 1720s

 Note (1722): Stooks Smith records the votes as Bromley 278, Clarke 213 and King 142.

Elections in the 1730s
 Death of Bromley

 Death of Clarke

 Death of Bromley

Elections in the 1740s

 Death of Butler

Elections in the 1750s
 Summons to the House of Lords of Cornbury, by writ in acceleration for his father's subsidiary title of Lord Hyde

 Note (1751): Stooks Smith records Turner's vote as 47.

Elections in the 1760s

 Death of Palmer

 Death of Bagot

Elections in the 1770s

Elections in the 1780s

Elections in the 1790s

Elections in the 1800s
 Resignation of Page

Elections in the 1810s

 Creation of Abbot as the 1st Lord Colchester

Elections in the 1820s

 Creation of Scott as the 1st Lord Stowell

 Seat vacated on the appointment of Peel as Secretary of State for the Home Department

 Resignation of Heber

 Seat vacated on the appointment of Peel as Secretary of State for the Home Department

 Resignation of Peel

 Note (1829): Stooks Smith records that the polls were open for three days. Inglis was a candidate promoted by the Ultra-Tories in opposition to Catholic emancipation.

Elections in the 1830s

Elections in the 1840s

 Note (1841): McCalmont classifies Inglis as a Peelite candidate, at this election.

 Note (1847): Poll 5 days. (Source for this note and the number of voters: Stooks Smith). McCalmont classifies Inglis as a Peelite and Gladstone as a Liberal Conservative candidate, at this election.

Elections in the 1850s

 

 Note (1852): Minimum possible turnout estimated by dividing votes by 2. To the extent that electors did not use both their votes, the figure will be an underestimate. McCalmont classifies Gladstone as a Liberal Conservative candidate, at this election.
 Seat vacated on the appointment of Gladstone as Chancellor of the Exchequer

 Resignation of Inglis.

 Seat vacated on the appointment of Gladstone as Lord High Commissioner to the Ionian Islands. McCalmont classifies Gladstone as a Liberal Conservative candidate, at this election.

 Seat vacated on the appointment of Gladstone as Chancellor of the Exchequer. McCalmont classifies Gladstone as a Liberal candidate, at this election.

Elections in the 1860s

 

 Note (1865): Turnout estimated in the same way as for the 1852 election.
 Seat vacated on the appointment of Hardy as President of the Poor Law Board

 Seat vacated on the appointment of Hardy as Secretary of State for the Home Department

{{Election box winning candidate unopposed with party link|
 |party = Conservative Party (UK)
 |candidate = John Mowbray |change = N/A}}

Elections in the 1870s

 Seat vacated on the appointment of Hardy as Secretary of State for War Creation of Hardy as the 1st Viscount CranbrookElections in the 1880s

Elections in the 1890s

 Death of MowbrayElections in the 1900s

Elections in the 1910s

 Anson became a Conservative MP in 1912 when the Liberal Unionist Party formally merged with the Conservative Party. Death of Anson Electorate expanded and elections using the bloc vote replaced by those using the single transferable vote, by the Representation of the People Act 1918, from the 1918 United Kingdom general election. Creation of Prothero as 1st Lord ErnleElections in the 1920s

Elections in the 1930s

 Resignation of CecilElections in the 1940s

 As two candidates achieved the quota only one count was necessary Constituency abolished (1950)References

Bibliography
 Boundaries of Parliamentary Constituencies 1885–1972, compiled and edited by F. W. S. Craig (Parliamentary Reference Publications 1972)
 British Parliamentary Election Results 1832–1885, compiled and edited by F. W. S. Craig (Macmillan Press 1977)
 British Parliamentary Election Results 1885–1918, compiled and edited by F. W. S. Craig (Macmillan Press 1974)
 British Parliamentary Election Results 1918–1949, compiled and edited by F. W. S. Craig (Macmillan Press, revised edition 1977)
 McCalmont's Parliamentary Poll Book: British Election Results 1832–1918 (8th edition, The Harvester Press 1971)
 The House of Commons 1715–1754, by Romney Sedgwick (HMSO 1970)
 The House of Commons 1754–1790, by Sir Lewis Namier and John Brooke (HMSO 1964)
 The Parliaments of England by Henry Stooks Smith (1st edition published in three volumes 1844–50), second edition edited (in one volume) by F. W. S. Craig (Political Reference Publications 1973))
 Who's Who of British Members of Parliament: Volume I 1832–1885, edited by M. Stenton (The Harvester Press 1976)
 Who's Who of British Members of Parliament, Volume II 1886–1918, edited by M. Stenton and S. Lees (Harvester Press 1978)
 Who's Who of British Members of Parliament, Volume III 1919–1945, edited by M. Stenton and S. Lees (Harvester Press 1979)
 Who's Who of British Members of Parliament, Volume IV 1945–1979'', edited by M. Stenton and S. Lees (Harvester Press 1981)

University constituencies of the Parliament of the United Kingdom
Historic parliamentary constituencies in England
Constituencies of the Parliament of the United Kingdom established in 1603
Constituencies of the Parliament of the United Kingdom disestablished in 1950
Constituency